The Haval H6 Coupe (also referred to as H6 C) is a compact crossover SUV based on the Haval H6 compact crossover produced by Haval of Great Wall Motor.

First generation (2015-2018)

Unveiled at the 2015 Shanghai Auto Show, the Haval H6 coupe is the production version of the previously launched Haval Coupe C concept which debuted at the 2014 Beijing Auto Show. Despite the slightly smaller dimensions compared to the regular Haval H6, it was positioned slightly higher in the market.

As of 2017, a Red Label and a Blue Label version featuring slightly different exterior styling were available targeted towards different client groups, with the Red Label Haval H6 coupe receiving redesigned front and rear fascias and the Blue label model largely remaining the same as the 2015 model.

Second generation (2017-2021)

A completely restyled Red Label version of the Haval H6 Coupe was introduced in 2018 with the whole vehicle redesigned, while selling alongside the original Haval H6 Coupe and making the original Haval H6 Coupe a Blue Label model. 

As of February 2019, a facelift replaced the logo with the updated black label badge and ending the Blue Label model, formally making the previous Red Label version of the Haval H6 Coupe the second generation model. The updated model uses a 1.5 liter turbo inline-4 engine producing 169 hp (124kW) and 285 N-m of torque.

References

External links

H6 Coupe
Compact sport utility vehicles
Front-wheel-drive vehicles
All-wheel-drive vehicles
Cars introduced in 2015
Cars of China